William Arthur Trenwith (15 July 1846 – 26 July 1925) was a pioneer trade union official and labour movement politician for Victoria, Australia.

Early life
Born to convict parents at Launceston, Tasmania, he followed his father's trade as a bootmaker. Largely unschooled, barely literate, and with poor eyesight, Trenwith had a gift for oratory and public speaking which was to assist him in union organising and later as a politician. He was involved during the late 1870s with the National Reform League where he agitated for protective tariffs, a land tax, and reform of the Victorian Legislative Council.

Labour movement
As one of the founding members of the Victorian Operative Bootmakers Union in 1879 he served as its Secretary in 1883. He was instrumental in coordinating the 1884 bootmakers' strike from Melbourne Trades Hall, which saw Victoria's first fullscale picketing and was an important campaign in the fight against sweated labour. He advocated the abolition of outwork in the bootmaking industry to eliminate cheap labour and encourage unionisation.

Trenwith honed his public oratory skills at North Wharf on the banks of the Yarra River, in Melbourne on Sunday afternoons, along with Joseph Symes, Chummy Fleming, and Monty Miller and many other Australian labour movement activists and radicals of the time.

In 1886, he was elected President of the Trades Hall Council, and was also made a Life Governor of the Homeopathic Hospital that year. By 1890 he was seen as a Trades Hall bureaucrat being opposed by radicals such as Chummy Fleming about working conditions, who accused Trenwith and other moderate THC bureaucrats, of 'working with blood-sucking capitalists.

Victorian politics
After a number of attempts at nomination, Trenwith was elected in May 1889 for the seat of Richmond (1889–1903) to the Victorian Legislative Assembly on a labour platform and sought reforms in education, unemployment and tariff protection. He was the lone labour representative in the Victorian Parliament until the following election in April 1892 when 13 labour aligned candidates were elected.

During 1892 Trenwith was elected leader of the Victorian Labour Party but continued to have problems at the grassroots with strong opposition from public meetings chaired by Chummy Fleming. During the 1892 maritime strike he argued strongly for compulsory arbitration over direct action, much to the disgust of labour radicals. In 1893 Trenwith opposed Chummy Fleming's proposal for the affiliation of the Knights of Labor to the Trades Hall Council on the grounds that as a secret organisation it could not be organised industrially.

In the Parliament of Victoria Trenwith served as Minister for Railways, commissioner for Public Works and vice-president of the Board of Land and Works between November 1900 and February 1901 in the Sir Alexander Peacock ministry, and briefly as Chief Secretary (1901–02). The Government he was part of came under attack in November 1902 from a Trades Hall motion from Chummy Fleming protesting against the reduction of old age pensions from 10/- to 8/-.

Federal politics

Trenwith was the only elected labour representative at the Federal Constitutional Convention (1897–98), which drafted a constitution for the Federation of the six Australian colonies in 1901. His support of Federation was over the objections of most in the labour movement, and served to ameliorate accusations of  the Age that the Federation Bill had been "wholly shaped in a conservative direction".

From 1903 to 1910 Trenwith served as an Independent Senator for Victoria. His withdrawal of support for the Federal Labor government of Andrew Fisher resulted in his defeat at the following election and retirement from federal politics.

He attempted to return to Victorian state politics at the 1911 Victorian state election, unsuccessfully contesting the seat of Gippsland North on behalf of the People's Party against the sitting Labor MLA James McLachlan.

Of "commanding intellect" (F.W. Eggleston), and often wearing a silk top hat, his undeniably significant career in labour politics seems to have been a stage in a journey which left his origins far behind him.

Personal life and death
Trenwith was married three times. His first marriage was to Susannah Page on 2 November 1868 and they had four children, a daughter and three sons. Susannah died in 1896. His second marriage was to Elizabeth Bright on 7 April 1896 and they would have three children, a daughter and two sons. Elizabeth died in 1923. His third marriage was to Helen Florence Sinclair on 1 October 1924.

Trenwith died in Melbourne on 26 July 1925, aged 79, survived by his third wife and his seven children.

References

1846 births
1925 deaths
Australian Labor Party members of the Parliament of Victoria
Australian trade unionists
Independent members of the Parliament of Australia
Politicians from Launceston, Tasmania
Members of the Australian Senate
Members of the Australian Senate for Victoria
Commonwealth Liberal Party members of the Parliament of Australia
Members of the Victorian Legislative Assembly
20th-century Australian politicians